Pope Leo XIII's papal encyclical on the subject of Freemasonry in Italy, known both by its Italian incipit  and its Latin incipit , was a promulgated on 15 October 1890.

It dealt with Freemasonry in Italy, condemning the contemporary course of public affairs in Italy as the realization of the "Masonic programme". This "programme" was said to involve a "deadly hatred of the Church", the abolition of religious instruction in schools and the absolute independence of civil society from clerical influence.

See also  
 Anti-Masonry
 Catholicism and Freemasonry
 Christianity and Freemasonry
 Declaration concerning status of Catholics becoming Freemasons
 List of encyclicals of Pope Leo XIII
 Papal documents relating to Freemasonry

References

1890 documents
1890 in Christianity
Catholicism and Freemasonry
Encyclicals of Pope Leo XIII
Freemasonry in Italy
History of Catholicism in Italy
October 1890 events